Expo for Design, Innovation & Technology (EDIT) is a 10-day festival launched by the Design Exchange (DX) in partnership with the United Nations Development Programme(UNDP). It is also supported by the Government of Ontario and its Ontario150 Program. The festival has received a $1.75 million investment from the Government of Ontario in 2017. The festival focuses on design, innovation and technology solutions and highlights the potential that the design industry has to solve issues on a global scale. The first annual festival took place in Toronto from September 28 to October 8, 2017, with a capacity of approximately 100,000 visitors.

The overall theme to EDIT was "Prosperity For All". It was inspired by the United Nations Development Program's (UNDP) Global Goals for Sustainable Development. The theme was portrayed through an art installation by designer Bruce Man, so co-founded Massive Change Network. It featured large black and white images of global conflict like pollution, genocide, and terrorism.

References

Canadian design
Design events
2017 festivals in North America
Festivals in Toronto
150th anniversary of Canada
2017 in Toronto